Kirrily Sharpe (born 25 February 1973) is a former professional tennis player from Australia.

Biography
Sharpe, a left-handed player from Sydney, trained with the Australian Institute of Sport in Canberra. She was a member of the Australian team which won the 1988 World Youth Cup, now known as the Junior Fed Cup.

While still only 17, she competed in the main draw of the 1990 French Open as a qualifier and scored an upset win over 14th seed Raffaella Reggi, en route to the third round. She also competed in junior Grand Slam events that year and made three finals. At the 1990 Wimbledon Championships, she was runner-up to Andrea Strnadová in the girls' singles, and was also a losing finalist in the girls' doubles, partnering Nicole Pratt. She won the girls' doubles title at the 1990 US Open with Kristin Godridge. The same pair won a WTA Tour doubles title at the 1990 Open Clarins in Paris.

A knee injury, suffered early in 1991, kept her out for the most of the year and required a reconstruction.

Sharpe made the third round of the 1992 Australian Open as a wildcard, with wins over Silke Meier and Anna Földényi.

In her only singles main-draw appearance at Wimbledon in 1993, she had a first-round match up with world No. 1, Steffi Graf, who beat the Australian 6–0, 6–0, losing only 18 points in the process.

Sharpe retired from professional tennis after the 1996 season.

WTA career finals

Doubles (1–0)

ITF finals

Singles (7–0)

Doubles (13–16)

References

External links
 
 

1973 births
Living people
Australian female tennis players
Tennis players from Sydney
Australian Institute of Sport tennis players
US Open (tennis) junior champions
Grand Slam (tennis) champions in girls' doubles
20th-century Australian women